Border Buckaroos is a 1943 American Western film written and directed by Oliver Drake. The fourth of Producers Releasing Corporation Texas Rangers film series, the film was shot at Corriganville movie ranch, and released on June 15, 1943.

Premise
A trio of Texas Rangers impersonate a gunslinger for hire and a co-inheritor of a ranch with the goal to "play both ends against the middle" to solve a murder of a rancher.

Cast
 James Newill as Ranger Jim Steel
 Dave O'Brien as Ranger Dave 'Tex' O'Brien
 Guy Wilkerson as Ranger Panhandle Perkins
 Christine McIntyre as Betty Clark 	
 Eleanor Counts as Marge Leonard
 Jack Ingram as Cole Melford 
 Ethan Laidlaw as Hank Dugan 
 Charles King as Rance Daggett
 Michael Vallon as Lawyer Seth Higgins
 Kenne Duncan as Tom Bancroft 
 Reed Howes as Trigger Farley 
 Bud Osborne as Stagecoach Driver 
 Slim Whitaker as Sheriff McAllister

Soundtrack
 Stay on the Right Trail 
Written by Dave O'Brien and James Newill
Sung by James Newill  
 Driftin'''
Written by Dave O'Brien and James Newill
Sung by James Newill  
 You're Here To Stay'' 
Written by Dave O'Brien and James Newill
Sung by James Newill

See also
The Texas Rangers series:
 The Rangers Take Over (1942)
 Bad Men of Thunder Gap (1943)
 West of Texas (1943)
 Border Buckaroos (1943)
 Fighting Valley (1943)
 Trail of Terror (1943)
 The Return of the Rangers (1943)
 Boss of Rawhide (1943)
 Outlaw Roundup (1944)
 Guns of the Law (1944)
 The Pinto Bandit (1944)
 Spook Town (1944)
 Brand of the Devil (1944)
 Gunsmoke Mesa (1944)
 Gangsters of the Frontier (1944)
 Dead or Alive (1944)
 The Whispering Skull (1944)
 Marked for Murder (1945)
 Enemy of the Law (1945)
 Three in the Saddle (1945)
 Frontier Fugitives (1945)
 Flaming Bullets (1945)

References

External links
 

1943 films
American black-and-white films
1943 Western (genre) films
Producers Releasing Corporation films
American Western (genre) films
Films directed by Oliver Drake
1940s English-language films
1940s American films